The 1911–12 NHA season was the third season of the National Hockey Association (NHA). Four teams played 18 games each. The Quebec Bulldogs would win the league championship and take over the Stanley Cup.

League business

Two NHA franchises would be dormant this season. Because the O'Briens had decided to give up hockey, the Renfrew Creamery Kings were disbanded prior to the season, with the players distributed to the other teams by a draw of names. Two new teams based in Toronto intended to operate this season, the 'Torontos' and the 'Tecumsehs', but the new Arena Gardens would not be ready for play this season, so neither team played. This left four teams to play 18 games each. The Wanderers were sold to Sam Lichtenhein.

Renfrew dispersal
 Cyclone Taylor, Don Smith—Wanderers
 Odie Cleghorn—Quebec
 Sprague Cleghorn—Toronto
 Bert Lindsay—Tecumsehs
 Skene Ronan—Ottawa
 Larry Gilmour —Canadiens

Source:

Taylor would refuse to report to the Wanderers, while Don Smith and Bert Lindsay would join the PCHA. Odie Cleghorn refused to report to Quebec and joined the Wanderers as did his brother Sprague.

Executive
 Emmett Quinn (president)

Board of Directors:
 E. McCafferty, Quebec
 Sam Lichtenhein, Wanderers,
 George Kennedy, Canadiens
 Charles Sparks, Ottawa
 J. Jane, Toronto
 Fred Robertson, Toronto

Rule changes
The rule changes implemented for this season introduced the format of play seen today.

For this season, the number of players per side was reduced to six by the elimination of the rover position. This was opposed by several teams, including the champion Ottawa team whose 'puck possession' style of play was dependent on the rover. The team would attempt during this season and next to get the league to return to seven-man hockey.

This season saw the introduction of major and minor fouls.

Major Fouls:
 throwing a stick to prevent a goal
 cross-checking
 charging
 deliberate tripping and hooking
 foul language

for which the player would be banished for the match and fined $5. Teams could substitute the player.

Minor Fouls:
 kicking, throwing, holding or batting puck with the hand
 raising stick above shoulder except for 'lifting'
 loafing offside

for which the player drew a caution. Three cautions and you were out. If your fines reached $25, special discipline might be warranted by the president.

Other Rules:
 number armbands to identify players
 home club to choose end
 overtime in case of tie
 unlimited substitution, however unless in case of injury, the player could not return

The O'Brien Cup was introduced for the NHA league championship winners.

The Canadiens team was to sign only francophone players and the other teams would refrain from doing so.

Source:
Coleman, "Trail of the Stanley Cup"

Equipment changes
The league would adopt the LeSueur goal and the Spalding puck as official equipment. This was the first season that numbers were attached to player jerseys. At first, they were attached by armbands, then eventually stitched onto the front of the jerseys. To identify the players to the fans, a large 'key' sign was hung at the side of the rink.

NHA – PCHA relations

In a foreshadowing of when the NHL in 1926 would declare the American Hockey League an "outlaw league", the NHA declared the Pacific Coast Hockey Association (PCHA) an "outlaw league" after it signed several NHA players. The league expelled Newsy Lalonde, Ernie Johnson and other players who signed with the PCHA 'for life' and barred NHA teams from playing PCHA teams. After the season, Art Ross arranged an 'all-star' tour of NHA players in British Columbia against the PCHA in defiance of the league. The NHA granted immunity for the players to play against the PCHA.

Regular season

Prior to the season, on November 2, Bruce Ridpath of the Stanley Cup champion Ottawa Hockey Club would be seriously injured with a fractured skull after being hit by an automobile on Yonge Street in Toronto. He lived in Toronto and was rumoured to be a possible manager of the future Toronto NHA franchise.

Fred Taylor went on public record stating that he would not play for Wanderers as he had a good position with the Interior Department in Ottawa, and would not play at all instead of playing for the Wanderers. Ottawa would attempt to secure his rights from Montreal. Ottawa would offer to trade Ronan (who would go on to win the scoring championship) for Taylor but was turned down.

On November 18, the NHA developed a schedule with a provisional opening date of the Arena Gardens late in January, and allowed the two new Toronto teams to play only away games at the start of the season. The architects of the Gardens assured them that the arena would be ready in time.

The PCHA raids, while taking players from the NHA, also meant the demise of the OPHL and players from the OPHL signed with NHA clubs, including Louis Berlinguette, Ernie Dubeau, Jack Marks and George Prodger.

In this season, the Ottawa Hockey Club became more commonly known as the 'Ottawa Senators'. The organization remained known as the Ottawa Hockey Association.

Highlights
Ronan of Ottawa would score 5 goals against the Wanderers on February 9, and follow up with 8 against the Wanderers on February 14. Gordon Roberts of the Wanderers would score 6 against the Canadiens on February 21.

On January 24, Fred 'Cyclone' Taylor played for Ottawa against the Wanderers, despite his rights being held by the Wanderers, for which he refused to play for. Ottawa would win the game, but it was protested and ordered replayed if necessary. This was Taylor's final game in the NHA, as he would join Vancouver the next year.

On March 2, Quebec defeated Ottawa 6–5 in a game decided after 23 minutes of overtime. With seven seconds to play, Joe Malone scored to tie the game. Joe Hall scored the winning goal. Ottawa would now have to play the replay game against the Wanderers in Montreal. On March 6, Ottawa lost the replay, and the loss would cost them a tie of the league championship, as Quebec finished 10–8 and Ottawa would finish 9–9.

Final standings

Post-season

Stanley Cup challenges
After the season, Quebec played one challenge against the Moncton Victorias. The Moncton team was essentially the same Galt team that had challenged Ottawa in 1911. This was the first series playing six to a side.

Moncton vs. Quebec

Quebec wins best-of-three series 2–0

Unplayed challenges

The Port Arthur Bearcats, who had previously challenged Ottawa in a Cup challenge in 1911, issued a challenge in February 1912. They were ordered by the Stanley Cup trustees to play off against Saskatoon in a two-game total-goals series to qualify. Port Arthur defeated Saskatoon 12–6. The club chose not to play a series against Quebec.

In February 1912, prior to the end of the PCHA season, the PCHA issued a challenge to play against the NHA champions. However, their season ended in March and it was considered too late for the PCHA champions (in this case the New Westminster Royals) to travel to the east to face Quebec. The challenge was postponed until December 1912. The challenge was never played.

Exhibitions

On March 10, the Wanderers and Canadiens played for the Montreal city hockey championship. Wanderers would win 10–2, despite an outstanding display by Georges Vezina.

Ottawa intended to hold a benefit game for Bruce Ridpath who had been injured in an automobile accident, intending to play a team composed of all-stars from the other NHA teams. After changing dates several times, the All-Star benefit game was set for March 16. The All-Star team would have Art Ross, Ernie Russell and Gordon Roberts of the Wanderers; Paddy Moran, Joe Malone and Joe Hall of Quebec; Didier Pitre Jack Laviolette and Ernie Dubeau of the Canadiens. Additionally, Cyclone Tayler had permission to play. However, two days before the event was to occur, the NHA president Emmett Quinn, while in New York city, booked the Wanderers and Canadiens for an exhibition game in Boston, and Ottawa was unable to make alternate arrangements, cancelling the NHA benefit. The Ottawa New Edinburghs, champions of the amateur Inter-Provincial Amateur Hockey Union (IPAHU) held their own benefit for Ridpath on March 23 against other IPAHU players. Future professional stars Clint Benedict, Harry Broadbent and Eddie Gerard played for Ottawa, which raised $300 for Ridpath, while Cyclone Taylor was the referee.

All four NHA teams played an exhibition series in New York and Boston from March 16 – March 23.

Art Ross All-Stars

A group of players, dubbed the 'Art Ross All-Stars' played three games against a PCHA all-star team in British Columbia from April 2 – April 6, losing two out of three games, 4–10, 2–8, 6–5. Hughie Lehman, Frank Patrick, Ernie Johnson, Newsy Lalonde, Tom Dunderdale, Ran McDonald and Harry Hyland played for the Western stars, and Paddy Moran, Art Ross, Hamby Shore, Skene Ronan, Joe Malone, Odie Cleghorn and Jack McDonald played for the East with Cyclone Taylor substituting for Malone.

Schedule and results

† Protested by Wanderers, replayed on March 6. Often mistaken as March 5th.

‡ Replay of protested game.

Player statistics

Goaltending averages

Scoring leaders

Stanley Cup engraving
The 1912 Stanley Cup was presented by the trophy's trustee William Foran.

The following Bulldogs players and staff were members of the Stanley Cup winning team.

1911–12 Quebec Bulldogs

See also
National Hockey Association
List of pre-NHL seasons
List of Stanley Cup champions
1911 in sports
1912 in sports
 1912 PCHA season

References

Bibliography
 
 Podnieks, Andrew; Hockey Hall of Fame (2004). Lord Stanley's Cup. Bolton, Ont.: Fenn Pub. pp 12, 50.

Notes

NHA
National Hockey Association seasons